Beatriz Amélia Alves de Sousa Oliveira Basto da Silva was born in Anadia, Portugal in 1944 and majored in history at the University of Coimbra with the thesis of Historiografia - o Conceito de História em António Caetano do Amaral (in Portuguese).

In Macau since 1970, taught history at the Secondary School and was also nominated to teach "Macau History" at the Magistrates Training Centre.

Integrated, upon invitation from the Macau Government, to the Territorial Commission for the Portuguese Discoveries Commemoration.

Was deputy for the 5th Legislature of the Legislative Assembly of Macau and integrated the Management Council of the Macau Foundation, where she retired from the Public Service.

Belonged to various Macau Associations, such as the Associação Para a Instrução dos Macaenses (APIM) , Santa Casa da Misericórdia and "Asianostra/ Estudo de Culturas". Furthermore, is a Correspondent Academic Member of the Portuguese Society of History, Member of the International Archive Council and Member of the Sociedade de Geografia de Lisboa.

Participated in various Trainings, Meetings and Congress; had other relevant roles in Macau, such as Director of the Primary Mastership (where she lectured about History of Macau, and was author of the respective program) and Director of the Macau Historical Archive, since its foundation in 1979, until 1984.

Known History researcher from Macau, has several articles published and participated in several conferences, beyond a vast collaboration dispersed in cultural magazines in Macau and Portugal.

Was also consultant in the TV Documentary Series "O Ocidente no Oriente", produced by Macau TDM.

Member of the Museum of Macau and author of one of the Book Chapter published in 1998, regarding the Museum.

Beatriz Basto da Silva also directed various courses of her expertise, being part of several Commissions created by the Macau Government and Macau Diocese.

In July 1997, was given the Medal of Cultural Merit by the Macau Government.

Multifaceted spirit, B.B. Silva also nurtures an artistic facet which led her to attend a painting training for 8 years, concluded later in Paris, with the sponsorship of Fundação Calouste Gulbenkian, aside from her studies of piano at Coimbra and Porto Music School.

Books
 Elementos da História de Macau (published by Direcção dos Serviços de Educação e Juventude Macau - EDU - 1986)
 Insígnias de Macau - Estudo (published by Leal Senado de Macau, 1986)
 Malaca: o Futuro no Passado e Em Malaca Redescobrir Portugal (both published by EDU, em 1989)
 Cronologia da História de Macau - Vol. I a V (published by Direcção dos Serviços de Educação e Juventude, Macau, 1992 - 1998)
 Emigração de Cules - Dossier Macau, 1851 - 1994 (published by Fundação Oriente, Macau, 1994)
 Silêncios (published by Mar Oceano, Macau, 1996)

Researches and Papers
 "Edições de Os Lusíadas existentes em Macau"
 "Macau e o Sião no séc. XVII"
 "Várias Epístolas - um perfil: D. Alexandre Gouveia, Bispo de Pequim"
 "Rivalidade Luso-Holandesa entre a Índia e Macau, nos séculos XVI e XVII"
 "O Padre Visitador Valignano, S.J. e o IV Centenário da Imprensa de Caracteres Móveis em Macau" (Revista de Cultura, nº6)
 "A Presença Portuguesa no Oriente" (CTT, 1989)
 "Heranças" (nº especial do Grupo Cultural de Macau na sua deslocação a Goa, Dez., 1990)
 "A Identidade Macaense" (Via Latina, Coimbra, 1991)
 "Malaca, a opulenta" (Revista Macau, nº 39, 1991)
 "Ponto de Encontro - Ponto de Partida - um Ponto Importante: Macau" (Portugal Turismo, nº4, VI série, Lisboa, 1990)
 "Macau - Um Sinal da Europa nas Relações Sino-Japonesas do Século XVI" (ed. Fundação Macau, em chinês, 1994)
 "Macaenses Who are they? A problem of identity" (Boletim de Estudos de Macau, Fundação Macau - Universidade de Macau, 1993 - em inglês e chinês)
 "Relações pluricomunitárias no Micro-Espaço: Macau" (in Seminário Internacional da Fundação Transcultural, Macau, 1993)
 "Viagens Portuguesas à Ásia e Japão no Período Renascentista" (in Tóquio, 1993, editado em 1994 em inglês e japonês)
 "Dª Juliana Dias da Costa - Uma cristã na Corte Mogol - Século XVIII" (Comunicação ao Congresso Internacional "O Rosto Feminino na Expansão Portuguesa", Lisboa, 1994).

Conferences
 Participated in a communication about "O Museu de Macau, uma referência para o futuro" at the "Ocidente e Extremo Oriente, Cultura Musical e Espírito" International Symposium, delivered from Lagos to Guimarães, between October the 3rd and 7th, 1997.
 Participated as speaker, "O Ministério Público - Alguns Aspectos Históricos", at the "O Ministério Público e a Sociedade" symposium, organized in Macau, on February the 20th and 21st, 1998.
 Participated as speaker, "Caminhos para uma Antropologia Recíproca", at the "O Culto a S. Gonçalo de Amarante" international conference in S. Paulo - Brasil - between September the 24th and 27th, 1999.
 Commissioner of the expo "Vida e Obra de Monsenhor Manuel Teixeira" and coordinator of the photo-bio-bibliographic album published by "Livros do Oriente". The expo took place at Lisbon, 1999 and travelled to Freixo-de-Espada-a-Cinta, where the Commissioner held a conference about "Monsenhor Teixeira e a Missão Portuguesa de Macau".
 Spoke at the "Portugal - Brasil - 500 Anos de História" conference about "Contactos entre Macau e o Brasil - Uma amostragem", at the Academia Portuguesa da História headquarters, Lisbon, May the 2nd, 2000.
 Presented a photography expo from Carmo Correia "Sentir Macau - O Património", at the Fundação Oriente, Lisbon, 2012.
 Made two conferences in Lisbon on the 1st centenary memory of  Mons. Teixeira; one at the Fundação Oriente and another at CCCM, both in 2012.
 Made a conference about the same topic, due to the same reason, in Macau, at IPOR, 2012.
 Gave an Open Class at the Senior University of Marinha Grande "Encontro de Culturas", 2009 and at the School nº 19 in Coimbra ("O Quotidiano de Macau", 2010).
 Integrated the discussion/debate panel on "Identidade Macaense" at the Letters Faculty of University of Coimbra - Geography Department.
 Presented a book from A.M. Couto Viana at the S.G.L., 2002.
 Presented the book "Memórias do Romanceiro de Macau" from J.J. Monteiro at IIST, Macau, 2013.
 Hosted the "Encontro de Fim-de-Tarde" at the Fundação Rui Cunha (Macau, 23 Jan. 2014) regarding "As Crianças na Expansão Portuguesa".

References

Living people
1944 births
People from Anadia, Portugal
20th-century Portuguese historians
University of Coimbra alumni
21st-century Portuguese historians